Meenakshii Chaudhary is an Indian actress, model and beauty pageant winner who also appears in Telugu films. She represented the state of Haryana at the Femina Miss India 2018 pageant, where she was crowned as Miss Grand India. Chaudhary represented India at Miss Grand International 2018 and was crowned as 1st runner up. She made her film debut with the Telugu film Ichata Vahanamulu Niluparadu in 2021.

Early life and education
Chaudhary was born in Panchkula, Haryana. Her late father B.R Chaudhary was a colonel in the Indian Army. She completed her schooling from the St. Soldier International Convent School in Chandigarh. She is also a state level swimmer and badminton player. Chaudhary completed her bachelor's degree in dental surgery from the National Dental College and Hospital in Dera Bassi, Punjab.

Pageantry

Miss IMA 2017
In 2017, Chaudhary was adjudged as Miss IMA during the Indian Military Academy Autumn Ball Night, which is held towards the end of each term, in order to mark the culmination of the training schedule of military cadets.

Femina Miss India

Chaudhary auditioned for the Fashion Big Bazaar sponsored Campus Princess 2018 where she was crowned as one of the winners from Patiala auditions. She then auditioned for the title Femina Miss Haryana 2018, which she eventually won. She represented the state of Haryana in the annual Femina Miss India competition.

During the final question and answer round of Femina Miss India 2018, all the Top 5 finalists were asked a common question “Who is a better teacher in life – success or failure?” Chaudhary responded by expressing:

She was crowned 1st runner up at the grand finale venued in Sardar Vallabhbhai Patel Indoor Stadium, Mumbai, on 19 June 2018. She also won the sub-title 'Miss Photogenic' at the competition.

Miss Grand International
Later, it was revealed by the Miss India Organization that Chaudhary had been considered as Miss Grand India, and would represent India at Miss Grand International 2018 pageant. She was officially crowned as Miss Grand India 2018 by the then reigning Miss Grand International 2017, María José Lora of Peru.

Chaudhary represented India at Miss Grand International 2018 pageant in Yangon, Myanmar, where she made it to the top 5 of the Miss Popular sub-contest. Her national costume's theme was Prayer of Peace, which was a tribute to her father, Late Col. B.R Chaudhary.

During the grand final event held on 25 October 2018, Chaudhary was asked, “If you were crowned as Miss Grand International 2018 tonight, which country would you choose to visit for your ‘Stop the war and violence’ campaign, and what would be your first message to them?” She replied by saying:

At the end of the event, she won the first runner-up title to the eventual winner, Clara Sosa of Paraguay. She is the first Indian woman to reach the said placement at the pageant.

In May 2019, Chaudhary was voted to the 2nd place in the list of Times 50 Most Desirable Women of India 2018, in an internet survey conducted by The Times of India.
 At the Femina Miss India 2019 sub-contest crowning ceremony, she was felicitated by the Miss India Organization for her accomplishments at Miss Grand International.

Acting career
Chaudhary made her acting debut with the web series titled Out of Love, which is an official adaptation of BBC drama series Doctor Foster. She played the role of Alia Kashyap, a 22 year old who faces adversity, stress and the repercussions for having a relationship with a married person.

In 2020, she was cast as a lead, opposite Sushanth Anumolu in a Telugu movie, titled Ichata Vahanamulu Niluparadu. Apart from pursuing her dental degree and modelling assignments, Chaudhary had enrolled in workshops. It was here that she initially met the actor Sushanth Akkineni. In connection with her debut film alongside the actor, she expressed - “Funnily, neither of us knew who the other was. I did not know he was an actor and he did not know I was a pageant winner”. A month after the workshop, she was called by Sushanth to share a film script, which she accepted. She stated - “In other words, it was my workshop that became my audition trials.” She was later signed up in Ramesh Varma Penmetsa's film titled Khiladi.

She has also been signed up as one of the female lead in the upcoming mystery-thriller film in Telugu language, titled HIT 2, which is a sequel to the 2020 film HIT: The First Case.

Filmography

Films

Television

Music videos

References

External links

1997 births
Femina Miss India winners
Indian beauty pageant winners
Living people
Female models from Haryana
Actresses from Haryana
Actresses in Telugu cinema
Actresses in Hindi television
Miss Grand International contestants